While there is much commonality, different parts of the tree of life use slightly different genetic codes. When translating from genome to protein, the use of the correct genetic code is essential. The mitochondrial codes are the relatively well-known examples of variation. The translation table list below follows the numbering and designation by NCBI.

 The standard code
 The vertebrate mitochondrial code
 The yeast mitochondrial code
 The mold, protozoan, and coelenterate mitochondrial code and the mycoplasma/spiroplasma code
 The invertebrate mitochondrial code
 The ciliate, dasycladacean and hexamita nuclear code
 The kinetoplast code; cf. table 4.
 cf. table 1.
 The echinoderm and flatworm mitochondrial code
 The euplotid nuclear code
 The bacterial, archaeal and plant plastid code
 The alternative yeast nuclear code
 The ascidian mitochondrial code
 The alternative flatworm mitochondrial code
 The Blepharisma nuclear code
 The chlorophycean mitochondrial code
 The trematode mitochondrial code
 The Scenedesmus obliquus mitochondrial code
 The Thraustochytrium mitochondrial code
 The Pterobranchia mitochondrial code
 The candidate division SR1 and gracilibacteria code
 The Pachysolen tannophilus nuclear code
 The karyorelict nuclear code
 The Condylostoma nuclear code
 The Mesodinium nuclear code
 The Peritrich nuclear code
 The Blastocrithidia nuclear code
 The Balanophoraceae plastid code
 The Cephalodiscidae mitochondrial code

The alternative translation tables (2 to 33) involve codon reassignments that are recapitulated in the list of all known alternative codons.

Table summary 

Comparison of alternative translation tables for all codons (using IUPAC amino acid codes):

Notes
Three translation tables have a peculiar status:
 Table 7 is now merged into translation table 4.
 Table 8 is merged to table 1; all plant chloroplast differences due to RNA edit.
 Table 15 is deleted in the source but included here for completeness.

Other mechanisms also play a part in protein biosynthesis, such as post-transcriptional modification.

References

See also 
 Genetic codes: list of alternative codons

External links
 NCBI List of Alternative Codes

Further reading
 
 

Codes
Gene expression